Latife is a Turkish feminine given name derived from the name Latifa. Notable people with the name include:

 Latife Tekin (born 1957), Turkish writer
 Latife Uşaki (1898–1975), wife of Mustafa Kemal Atatürk

Turkish feminine given names